United States v. Harris, 106 U.S. 629 (1883), or the Ku Klux Kase, was a case in which the US Supreme Court held that it was unconstitutional for the federal government to penalize crimes such as assault and murder in most circumstances. The Court declared that only state governments have the power to penalize those crimes.

In the specific case, four men were removed from a Crockett County, Tennessee, jail by a group led by Sheriff R. G. Harris and 19 others. The four men were beaten, and one was killed. A deputy sheriff tried to prevent the act but failed.

Section 2 of the Force Act of 1871 was declared unconstitutional on the theory that an Act to enforce the Equal Protection Clause applied only to state actions, not individuals' actions.

See also
 List of United States Supreme Court cases, volume 106
United States v. Morrison

References

Further reading

External links
 

United States Supreme Court cases
United States Supreme Court cases of the Waite Court
Criminal cases in the Waite Court
United States equal protection case law
United States Supreme Court criminal cases
1883 in United States case law
1883 in Tennessee
Legal history of Tennessee
Crockett County, Tennessee
Ku Klux Klan